Giuseppe De Piro or Joseph De Piro, (2 November 1877 – 17 September 1933) was a Roman Catholic priest and missionary. He founded the Missionary Society of St Paul (MSSP) in June 1910 with a charism to form missionaries following the example of St Paul. Presently holding the status of Servant of God, he is a candidate for beatification.

Life

De Piro was born in Mdina, Malta on 2 November 1877 and was ordained to the priesthood in 1902 in Rome.  Although he was involved in various ministries within the church, his main concern was the missions and work amongst the poor.  He continued to work towards his long cherished dream of establishing a society of priests and brothers committed to the spreading of the gospel. From accepting the first two members in 1910 he waited eleven years for the official approval by the local bishop and seventeen years before Brother Joseph Caruana became the first Paulist missionary, and was sent to Ethiopia, where he remained until his death in 1975 at the age of 83.

De Piro started off with a small community in Mdina, and died at the age of 55 in 1933 when the society was in its very initial stages. Over the years, members joined and the mission started with the Maltese emigrants in Australia and also in the US and Canada.

The first foundation in Australia in 1948 had been in Sydney three years earlier than the foundation in Melbourne.  Both cities had a huge concentration of Maltese people, 23,000 in Melbourne alone.

About forty years ago, the first group of three missionaries went to work in Peru. Other missions in Pakistan and the Philippines followed. The society's general administration is in Rome. They are established in Australia, mainly in Melbourne and Sydney, in Peru in Arequipa and Lima, in Pakistan in Lahore and, Manila and in Bataan in the Philippines. The latest mission to be opened is the one in Cuba, in 2017.

External links
 Joseph De Piro information website

References

1877 births
1933 deaths
20th-century Maltese Roman Catholic priests